Ferdinand Feigl (25 May 1898 – 31 December 1961) was an Austrian footballer. He played in two matches for the Austria national football team from 1916 to 1925.

References

External links
 

1898 births
1961 deaths
Austrian footballers
Austria international footballers
Place of birth missing
Association footballers not categorized by position